Train Home is an album by American singer/songwriter Chris Smither, released in 2003. Guest Bonnie Raitt provides slide guitar and backup vocals on "Desolation Row".

Reception

Writing for Allmusic, critic Hal Horowitz called the release "a quiet gem" and wrote of the album "Chris Smither settles into his distinctive combination of folk and blues with this excellent release. Although not pushing established boundaries, his rich, velvety voice and mature spoken-sung vocals convey a sense of truth and add depth to these introspective compositions." Music critic Robert Christgau gave the album a choice cut for "Let It Go".

Track listing
All songs by Chris Smither unless otherwise noted.
 "Train Home" – 4:12
 "Outside In" – 4:11
 "Confirmation" – 4:05
 "Crocodile Man" (Dave Carter) – 3:33
 "Lola" - 3:27
 "Desolation Row" (Bob Dylan) – 7:45
 "Call Time" – 3:35
 "Candy Man" (Mississippi John Hurt) – 3:37
 "Never Needed It More" – 3:17
 "Let It Go" – 4:33
 "Kind Woman" (Richie Furay) - 3:50

Personnel
Chris Smither – vocals, guitar
David "Goody" Goodrich - guitar, banjo, bass, mandolin, piano, slide guitar, reed organ
Richard Downs - horn
Mike Piehl - drums
Bonnie Raitt - background vocals, slide guitar
Louise Ulrich - bass
Anita Suhanin - background vocals

Production
Produced by David "Goody" Goodrich
Mastered by Bob St. John
Engineered and mixed by Mark Thayer
Design by Jason Kruppa
Photography by Thomas Petillo & Abigail Seymour

See also
List of train songs

References

2003 albums
Chris Smither albums